Samuel Dunn Parker (September 9, 1868 – October 22, 1953) was an American militia officer in the Massachusetts Volunteer Militia and the State Guard of Massachusetts. He was inspector general of the Massachusetts Volunteer Militia and commander of the State Guard regiments deployed during the Boston Police Strike. He also served as commissioner of the Boston Fire Department.

Early life
Parker was born on September 9, 1868 in Milton, Massachusetts, United States. He was the scion of a wealthy family of Massachusetts textile industrialists; his father, Charles Henry Parker, was treasurer of the Suffolk Savings Bank and a one-time member of the Boston Common Council. He attended public school in Milton and graduated from Harvard College in 1891. At Harvard, Parker was a member of the varsity rowing crew.

Military career

Massachusetts Volunteer Militia
Parker joined the state militia in on December 3, 1889 as a member of the 1st corps of cadets. In 1895 he was made a sergeant of Battery A. Two years later he was promoted to lieutenant and on July 18, 1898 was made captain of the battery. In 1906, Governor Curtis Guild Jr. appointed Parker assistant inspector general with the rank of lieutenant colonel. In 1908 he was promoted to inspector general with the rank of brigadier general. He retired from the militia on December 27, 1911.

State Guard of Massachusetts
On April 5, 1917, the Massachusetts General Court created the State Guard of Massachusetts after the Massachusetts National Guard was mustered into federal service. The organization was to serve as a home guard during World War I. On April 18, 1917, Governor Samuel W. McCall appointed Parker to the State Guard Board, which was tasked with organizing the new Guard. Once the guard was formed, Parker was placed in command of the Guard's 4th brigade.

During the 1919 Boston Police Strike, Parker was placed in command of the six State Guard regiments called out to police the city. Parkered order the cavalry to establish dead lines in areas where crowds were collecting and to keep people moving while using as little violence as possible. The guard went on duty on September 10, 1919 with 5,000 soldiers patrolling the streets. That night two men were killed when guardsmen opened fire on an unruly crowd in South Boston. Another was killed during a riot in Scollay Square. Another man was shot and killed by the guardsmen the following day during the arrest of 44 men who were shooting craps. The guard was relieved from duty on December 21, 1919 after the Boston Police Department had recruited enough new members to begin policing the city again.

The State Guard was disbanded in 1920.

Fire commissioner
On January 30, 1908, Mayor George A. Hibbard removed fire commissioner Benjamin W. Wells from office and named Parker to replace him. Parker was allowed to remain as inspector general of the militia while serving as fire commissioner. On May 26, 1910, Parker sent in his resignation to Mayor John F. Fitzgerald. It was accepted the following day and Francis M. Carroll of the bath department was named acting commissioner.

Professional career
Parker worked as a real estate broker, was treasurer of the Ipswich Mills and New England Home for Little Wanderers, vice president of the Suffolk Savings Bank, president of the Home for Aged Women, and a director of the Merchants National Bank.

Parker died on October 22, 1953 at his home in Boston.

References

Works cited 
 

1868 births
1953 deaths
Commissioners of the Boston Fire Department
Harvard Crimson rowers
Harvard College alumni
Massachusetts National Guard personnel
People from Milton, Massachusetts